Elliot Norton (17 May 1903 – 20 July 2003) was a Boston-based theater critic who was one of the most influential regional theater critics in his 48-year-long career, during which he who wrote 6,000 reviews and became known as "The Dean of American Theatre Critics".  Norton practiced a style of criticism known as "play doctoring", where he made suggestions on how to improve a show. Boston was a major pre-Broadway tryout town, and Elliot's criticism was taken seriously by producers, directors and playwrights, including Joshua Logan, Mike Nichols, and Neil Simon.

Norton was called "the most valuable critic in America" by producer Alexander Cohen. According to Logan: Elliot had an absolute dead eye for a play. He could see it once and form an opinion that struck at the very core. He was very helpful to me on every show I brought to Boston. He had a gentlemanly manner, and even if what he had to say was rough, he could tell you without breaking your heart.

Early life
Born William Elliot Norton in Boston to William L. Norton and Mary (Fitzgerald) Norton, he attended Harvard College (Class of 1926) after graduating from the Boston Latin School. At Harvard College, he took George Pierce Baker's class for dramatists. Baker's most famous student was Eugene O'Neill, whose plays were revolutionizing Broadway theater at the time Norton became a drama critic.

Journalism career
Norton began his career as a newspaperman with The Boston Post after graduating from Harvard in 1926. By 1934, he was promoted from reporter to the editor of the drama section, where he began to make his name as a critic. The Post went out of business in 1956, and Norton was hired by the Boston Record American, which evolved into the Boston Herald American, which eventually became the Boston Herald after he retired in 1982.

In addition to his newspaper reviews, he was a television critic on Boston television, including public TV station WGBH, where he hosted Elliot Norton Reviews. The show ran for 1,100 episodes from 1958 to 1982.

Play doctor
Norton practiced drama criticism when the relationship between the regional critic and playwrights whose shows were undergoing tryouts in their towns were not as adversarial as they were to become. Frank Rich, who became prominent as a theater critic for The New York Times, wrote about how Norton's role as a "play doctor" was part of its times:
What people should remember was that in his heyday ... the Josh Logans and Rodgers and Hammersteins looked to out-of-town critics for informed advice about how to `fix their shows.' Critics like Norton relished playing the role. They went back to see plays at the end of the run and that was just the way the Broadway theater worked. Newspapers and audiences accepted it as part of the process as critics would write columns that combined repertorial, critical, and advice-giving elements. It would be considered
highly inappropriate today to talk to the writers and producers outside of columns, but it was a different world.

Two major theatrical successes that Norton was credited with midwifing while they were in their Boston tryouts were Oklahoma! and The Odd Couple.

Oklahoma!
Norton provided input by his printed criticism and informally. Retitled Oklahoma! when it opened on Broadway, the musical not only was a smash but helped change the face of American musical theater.

The Odd Couple
Neil Simon said that Norton's criticism of The Odd Couple helped him improve the play. Appearing on the show Eliott Norton Reviews, in his conversation with Simon, Elliott said that the play went "flat" in its final act.  As it appeared originally in Boston, the characters the Pidgeon Sisters did not appear in the final act.

Simon told The Boston Globe: He invited one of the stars and the writer. He loved the play and gave it a wonderful review but he said the third act was lacking something. On the show he said, `You know who I missed in the third act was the Pidgeon Sisters,' and it was like a light bulb went off in my head. It made an enormous difference in the play. I rewrote it and it worked very well. I was so grateful to Elliot ... Elliot had such a keen eye. I don't know if he saved the play or not, but he made it a bigger success.

Honors
In 1964, Norton received the George Jean Nathan Award for drama criticism in 1964 and a Special Tony Award for distinguished commentary in 1971. He was elected a Fellow of the American Academy of Arts and Sciences in 1966. His show, Elliot Norton Reviews,  received the Peabody Award, one of television's greatest honors.

The year he retired in 1982, he was honored by the establishment of the Elliot Norton Awards  to recognize theatrical excellence in the Boston theater. The American Theater Critics Association inducted him into the Theater Hall of Fame in 1988.

Death
The centenarian critic died on July 20, 2003 in Fort Lauderdale, Florida. He was buried at Mount Auburn Cemetery, in Cambridge.

Publications
Broadway Down East: An Informal Account of the Plays, Players, and Playhouses of Boston from Puritan Times to the Present (1978)

References

1903 births
2003 deaths
American theater critics
Harvard College alumni
Boston Latin School alumni
Special Tony Award recipients
American centenarians
Men centenarians
Burials at Mount Auburn Cemetery
The Boston Post people